The Struma operation was the occupation of a part of northeastern mainland Greece by the Bulgarian army, during the First World War between 17–23 August 1916. It was named after the Struma (Strymonas) river.

Background
In August 1916 Romania chose to join the war effort on the side of the Allies. The Allies planned a large offensive in the Macedonian front for the middle of August in order to support Romania's entry in the war and pin down as many Bulgarian forces as possible. The Bulgarian high command suspected an impending offensive and the fighting around Doiran that erupted on 9 August only confirmed these suspicions. On their part the Bulgarians had urged for an offensive in Macedonia since the beginning of the year and now planned a strike with the First Army and Second Army on both Allied flanks.

On the western flank, the Chegan Offensive resulted in the conquest of Florina, but the First Army failed to take Chegan (today Agios Athanasios).

The plan on the eastern flank was to seize the Drama-Komotini railway and this objective was given to the Bulgarian Second Army and the 10th Aegean Division. For the operation general Todorov could rely on 58 battalions, 116 machine guns, 57 artillery batteries and 5 cavalry squadrons in his army and an additional 25 battalions, 24 machine guns, 31 batteries and 5 squadrons in the 10th Division.

Occupation and consequences 
The Struma Offensive began on 18 August with the 7th Rila, 11th Macedonian Division and the 3/2 Infantry Brigade and 10th Division advancing on a 230 kilometer long front. For six days the Bulgarian forces achieved all their objectives in the face of weak Greek and French resistance: following the ouster of pro-Entente Prime Minister Eleftherios Venizelos, the royal Greek government in Athens had demobilized it forces, and pursued a course of neutrality at all costs, even ordering the local Greek troops to not resist the Bulgarian invasion.

The depth of the advance reached 80-90 kilometers and an area of 4,000 square kilometers was occupied. Most importantly however the Macedonian Front was shortened with 100 - 120 kilometers. In addition, the demobilized Greek IV Army Corps, under Col. Ioannis Hatzopoulos, numbering 464 officers and 6373 soldiers, that was positioned in the area but wasn't allowed by the Greek government to resist, was disbanded and its troops and armament were interned by the Germans in Görlitz for the rest of the war. General Nikolaos Christodoulou did not obey to the government and together with his men joined the Movement of National Defence, that broke out in Thessaloniki. 

The cities of Kavala, Drama and Serres were taken.

Aftermath
The refusal by the Greek government to defend this territory, won after hard fighting in the Second Balkan War of 1913, led to a coup by pro-Venizelist officers and the formation of the so-called "Provisional Government of National Defence". Greece joined the war in 1917 and eventually recovered all of the occupied territories in 1918, at the war's end.

References

Battles of the Balkans Theatre (World War I)
Battles of World War I involving Bulgaria
Battles of World War I involving Greece
Battles of World War I involving France
1916 in Bulgaria
August 1916 events